Aron Lynas (born 19 April 1996) is a Scottish footballer who plays as a defender for Scottish League Two side Dumbarton. He has also played for Cowdenbeath, Alloa Athletic, East Stirlingshire, Brechin City and Albion Rovers.

Career
Born in Kirkcaldy, Fife, Lynas began his career at Cowdenbeath. He was first named in a matchday squad on 21 December 2013, remaining an unused substitute in their 3–3 draw at Raith Rovers in the Scottish Championship. Over the season and the following campaign, he was named for ten more league games, but never made an appearance. On 21 May 2015, after relegation to Scottish League One, he was one of six players released by the club.

Lynas returned to the Scottish Championship with Alloa Athletic. He made his professional debut on 16 August 2015, replacing Graeme Holmes in the 57th minute of a 1–5 home defeat to Rangers.

In October 2015, Lynas was loaned out to Scottish League Two bottom side East Stirlingshire as an emergency loan until January 2015. He made his debut on 3 October, playing the full 90 minutes of a 2–1 loss at Berwick Rangers. On 14 November, he was sent off in a 5–3 loss at East Fife, the last of three dismissals that day. Following the relegation of the Shire as well as his parent club, Lynas was released by Alloa.

After his released from Alloa, Lynas signed for Scottish League One side Brechin City for the 2016–17 season.

On 29 May 2019, Lynas signed a pre-contract with Albion Rovers for the 2019–20 season. After three seasons at Cliftonhill, during which time he captained the club, Lynas joined Dumbarton in the summer of 2022. He scored his first goal for the club in a 4-0 victory against Elgin City in November 2022.

Career statistics

References

External links
 
 

1996 births
Living people
Footballers from Kirkcaldy
Scottish footballers
Association football midfielders
Cowdenbeath F.C. players
Alloa Athletic F.C. players
East Stirlingshire F.C. players
Brechin City F.C. players
Albion Rovers F.C. players
Scottish Professional Football League players
Dumbarton F.C. players